The R39 is a provincial route in South Africa that connects Standerton with Ermelo. It is a route in the province of Mpumalanga.

Route
The R39 has its beginnings in Baumann Street, Florapark, northern Standerton, at an intersection with the R50, R23 and R546 routes. It leaves the town in a north-easterly direction with the Grootdraai Dam to its east. Junctioning with the R38 that heads north to Bethal, it continues north-easterly crossing the Blesbokspruit before entering Morgenzon as Steyn Street, bisecting the north-south R35 road in the town. Leaving the town, it continues north-east to Ermelo, ending at a T junction with the N17 (Bethal Road; Joubert Street).

References

External links
 Routes Travel Info

39

Provincial routes in South Africa